Florence and Isaac Budovitch House  is a historic home located at Wilmington, New Castle County, Delaware. It was added to the National Register of Historic Places in 2020.

History
The Florence and Isaac Budovitch House was built by Edgar Tafel, who was commissioned by Florence and Isaac Budovitch to build a house as they faced anti-Semitism in the housing market. It was constructed between 1955 and 1956 in a Contemporary style with Prairie School/Wrightian influences.

References

Buildings and structures in Wilmington, Delaware
Buildings and structures on the National Register of Historic Places in Delaware
National Historic Landmarks in Delaware
National Register of Historic Places in Wilmington, Delaware